The office of Sheriff of Sussex was established before the Norman Conquest. The Office of sheriff remained first in precedence in the counties until the reign of Edward VII when an Order in Council in 1908 gave the Lord-Lieutenant the prime office under the Crown as the Sovereign's personal representative.

At various times the sheriff of Surrey was also sheriff of Sussex (1229–1231, 1232–1240, 1242–1567, 1571–1635), The office of Sheriff of Sussex ceased with local government re-organisation in 1974, when the county was split for local government purposes into East Sussex (see High Sheriff of East Sussex) and West Sussex (see High Sheriff of West Sussex). The High Sheriffs remain the Sovereign's representative in the County for all matters relating to the Judiciary and the maintenance of law and order.

List of officeholders

1229–1565

1566–1570

1571–1636

1636–1702

1702–1799

1800–1899

1900–1973

References

 
Sussex